Azaka Mede (also known by various names such as: Kouzin, Couzen, Azake, Mazaka, Mede, Papa Zaka, Zaca, Papa Zaca, Cousin Zaca, etc.) is the loa of the harvest in Haitian Vodou mythology. 

He evolved after the Haitian Revolution when slaves were able to own land. Depicted as a country bumpkin who loves to eat, he is kind and gentle and he has no alternate sinister (petro) form.  He is seen as a protector of peasants and defender of the poor, and is identified with Saint Isadore. He is celebrated and affiliated with Labor Day in Haiti (May 1).

The name Azaka may have come from the language of the Indigenous Taino people, in which "zada" meant corn, and "maza" meant maize. Azaka Medeh belongs to the same family of spirits as Azaka-Tonnerre, loa of thunder.

Asaka is the loose female interpretation of him as mother of the earth in the Broadway musical Once on This Island.

Azaka and the relation to Sakpata, the deity of the earth 
In recent years, there has been a growing movement among practitioners of Vodou in the diaspora to travel to the Benin Republic to reconnect with their roots and learn from Vodou practitioners there. One area of particular interest has been the vodou Azaka, a deity associated with agriculture and fertility.

However, as these practitioners have delved deeper into their research, they have discovered that Azaka may in fact be Sakpata, a deity associated with the earth, healing, and disease in West African Vodou.

This discovery has been both surprising and illuminating for many practitioners. On one hand, it challenges long-held assumptions about the nature of Azaka and its place in Haitian Vodou practice. On the other hand, it opens up new avenues for exploration and connection between practitioners in the diaspora and their counterparts in West Africa.

As practitioners continue to learn more about Sakpata and its relationship to Azaka, they are gaining a deeper appreciation for the complexity and richness of Vodou practice. They are also discovering new ways to incorporate this knowledge into their own practice and to share it with others.

Ultimately, this renewed interest in Sakpata and its connection to Azaka is a testament to the power and resilience of Vodou as a living tradition. As practitioners continue to explore and evolve their practice, they are keeping this vibrant and dynamic tradition alive for future generations.

References

Harvest deities
Supernatural beings identified with Christian saints
Haitian Vodou gods